Giulia Mazzocchi is an Italian ice hockey goaltender, currently playing for HC Lugano and the Italian national team.

In 2018, she was named Best Goaltender in the IIHF World Champhionships Division 1B.

External links
 Biographical information and career statistics from Elite Prospects

References 

HC Lugano players
1991 births
Living people
People from Burggrafenamt
Italian women's ice hockey players
St. Lawrence Saints women's ice hockey players
Sportspeople from Südtirol